Henry Brydges, 2nd Duke of Chandos, KB (17 January 1708 – 28 November 1771), known from 1727 to 1744 by the courtesy title Marquess of Carnarvon, was the second son of the 1st Duke of Chandos and his first wife Mary Lake. He was the Member of Parliament for Hereford from 1727 to 1734, for Steyning between 1734 and 1741, and Bishop's Castle between 1741 and 1744.

Career and titles
Henry Brydges was born the second son of the Hon. James Brydges, eldest son of the 8th Baron Chandos. He was educated at Westminster School and St John's College, Cambridge. On his father succeeding as 9th Baron Chandos in 1714 (and shortly thereafter being created Earl of Carnarvon), he became The Hon. Henry Brydges, and in 1719, on his father being created Duke of Chandos, he became Lord Henry Brydges. His elder brother died without male issue in 1727, at which point he became heir to the dukedom and acquired the courtesy title Marquess of Carnarvon.

From 1729 to 1735 Carnarvon was Master of the Horse to Frederick, Prince of Wales, and in 1732 was invested as a Knight of the Bath. On the death of his father, he succeeded as 2nd Duke of Chandos.

He was described by King George II as "a hot-headed, passionate, half-witted coxcomb".

Financial problems
When his father died on 9 August 1744, the estate was heavily burdened by debt, the family having lost money in the South Sea Bubble. A decision was made to demolish the family seat, Cannons. In 1747 a twelve-day demolition sale saw both the contents and the very structure of the house itself sold piecemeal. The auction of the contents, beginning on 1 June 1767, and of the house and out-house materials, starting on 16 June, were each handled by the respected auctioneer Christopher Cock.

Marriages and children

On 21 December 1728, he married Lady Mary Bruce (1710–1738), daughter of Charles Bruce, 4th Earl of Elgin and Lady Anne Saville. They had two children who survived childhood, Lady Caroline Brydges (1729–1789) and James Brydges, 3rd Duke of Chandos (1731–1789) who were painted by Bartholomew Dandridge in 1738

The Duke's second marriage was unconventional. In 1744, he married Anne Wells, a former chambermaid from Newbury in Berkshire. They had met a few years earlier in circumstances described by a witness as follows:The Duke of Chandos and a companion dined at the Pelican, Newbury, on the way to London. A stir in the Inn yard led to their being told that a man was going to sell his wife, and they are leading her up with a halter around her neck. They went to see. The Duke was smitten with her beauty and patient acquiescence in a process which would (as then supposed) free her from a harsh and ill-conditioned husband. He bought her, and subsequently married her (at Keith's Chapel) Christmas Day, 1744.

Anne died in 1759, without male issue, and Chandos married for a third time in 1767 to Elizabeth Major (1731–1813), daughter of Sir John Major, 1st Baronet.

References

2
Knights Companion of the Order of the Bath
Brydges, Henry
1708 births
1771 deaths
British MPs 1727–1734
British MPs 1734–1741
Henry
People educated at Westminster School, London
Alumni of St John's College, Cambridge
People from Stanmore
People from Shaw-cum-Donnington
Lords of the Manor of Totteridge
Freemasons of the Premier Grand Lodge of England
Grand Masters of the Premier Grand Lodge of England